Kafirnigania is a genus of flowering plants belonging to the family Apiaceae. It has only one species, Kafirnigania hissarica. Its native range is Central Asia.

References

Apioideae
Flora of Central Asia
Plants described in 1947